Hispidin is a natural substance. It can also be synthesized.

Hispidin 4-O-β-D-glucopyranoside can be found in Pteris ensiformis whereas hispidin derivatives, such as phellibaumins, can be found in the edible mushroom Inonotus xeranticus or Phellinus.  Hispidin is a precursor of fungal luciferin, a compound responsible for light emission by luminous mushrooms.

See also 
 Davallialactone
 Phellibaumin

References 

Hispidins